The Aramaic original New Testament theory is the belief that the Christian New Testament was originally written in Aramaic. 

There are six versions of the New Testament in Aramaic languages: 

the Vetus Syra (Old Syriac), a translation from Greek into early Classical Syriac, containing most—but not all—of the text of the 4 Gospels, and represented in the Curetonian Gospels and the Sinaitic Palimpsest
the Christian Palestinian Aramaic Lectionary fragments represented in such manuscripts as Codex Climaci Rescriptus, Codex Sinaiticus Rescriptus, and later lectionary codices (Vatican sir. 19 [A]; St Catherine’s Monastery B, C, D)
the Classical Syriac Peshitta, a rendering in Aramaic of the Hebrew (and some Aramaic, e.g. in Daniel and Ezra) Old Testament, plus the New Testament purportedly in its original Aramaic, and still the standard in most Syriac churches
the Harklean, a strictly literal translation by Thomas of Harqel into Classical Syriac from Greek
the Assyrian Modern Version, a new translation into Assyrian Neo-Aramaic from the Greek published in 1997 and mainly in use among Protestants
and a number of other scattered versions in various dialects

The traditional New Testament of the Peshitta has 22 books, lacking the Second Epistle of John, the Third Epistle of John, the Second Epistle of Peter, the Epistle of Jude and the Book of Revelation, which are books of the Antilegomena. Closure of the Church of the East's New Testament Canon occurred before the 'Western Five' books could be incorporated.  Its Gospels text also lacks the verses known as Jesus and the woman taken in adultery (John 7:53–8:11) and Luke 22:17–18, but does have the 'long ending of Mark.'

Greek original New Testament hypothesis

The consensus of modern scholars is that the New Testament was written in Greek and that an Aramaic source text was used for portions of the New Testament, especially the gospels. They acknowledge that many individual sayings of Jesus as found in the Greek Gospels may be translations from an Aramaic source referred to as "Q source" (from the German word Quelle), but hold that the Gospels' text in its current form was composed in Greek, and so were the other New Testament writings. Scholars of all stripes have acknowledged the presence of scattered Aramaic expressions, written phonetically and then translated, in the Greek New Testament.

In an 1887 book, John Hancock Pettingell says "The common impression that the entire New Testament was first written in Greek, and that all the copies we now have, in whatever tongue, are copies, or translations of the original manuscripts, when seriously examined, is found to have no certain foundation. And yet this has been taken almost universally for granted. It is probable, that this is true with respect to some, possibly a majority of these books. But it is more than probable, if not certain, that some portions of the New Testament, such as the Gospel of Matthew, the Epistles to the Hebrews, and others, which will hereafter be mentioned, were first written in the vernacular Syriac of the Jews, and were afterward translated into Greek; and that other portions, perhaps most of the books, were duplicated, at the time they were written, by their authors, or under their direction,—one copy being furnished to those who were familiar with the Greek, and another to those who knew only the Syriac."

An example of how mainstream scholars have dealt with Aramaic influences within an overall view of the Gospels' original Greek-language development may be found in Martin Hengel's synthesis of studies of the linguistic situation in Palestine during the time of Jesus and the Gospels:
Since non-literary, simple Greek knowledge or competency in multiple languages was relatively widespread in Jewish Palestine including Galilee, and a Greek-speaking community had already developed in Jerusalem shortly after Easter, one can assume that this linguistic transformation [from "the Aramaic native language of Jesus" to "the Greek Gospels"] began very early.  ...  [M]issionaries, above all 'Hellenists' driven out of Jerusalem, soon preached their message in the Greek language. We find them in Damascus as early as AD 32 or 33. A certain percentage of Jesus' earliest followers were presumably bilingual and could therefore report, at least in simple Greek, what had been heard and seen. This probably applies to Cephas/Peter, Andrew, Philip or John. Mark, too, who was better educated in Jerusalem than the Galilean fishermen, belonged to this milieu.  The great number of phonetically correct Aramaisms and his knowledge of the conditions in Jewish Palestine compel us to assume a Palestinian Jewish-Christian author.  Also, the author's Aramaic native language is still discernible in the Marcan style.

Aramaic original New Testament hypothesis
Although physical evidence has yet to be found, J.S. Assemane in his Bibliotheca stated that a Syriac Gospel dated 78 A.D. was found in Mesopotamia.

The hypothesis that the New Testament text that was read by the Apostles would have preserved the life and sayings of Jesus (as he spoke them in Aramaic – the language of Jesus) before it was translated for those not among them who spoke Greek is not held by the majority of scholars.

Syrian churches say that their history includes compilation of their canon (which lacked the 'Western Five') extremely early.  Comments John Hancock Pettingell, "There is no question, but that scattered manuscripts of the several books of the New Testament, in Greek, were in existence very early, for the Fathers quote from them,—but there is no evidence that any attempt was made to collect them into one code, or canon, till after the Second or Third Century. But it is certain, on the other hand, that the Syrian Churches had their canon long before this collection was made; tradition says, between the years 55 and 60, and that this was done by the Apostle Jude. This canon is known to have contained all the books now included in our New Testament, excepting the Apocalypse, and the brief Epistles of 2d Peter, 2d and 3d John, and Jude. This tradition is strongly corroborated by the fact that these closing portions of our present canon were not then written; and this is a good and sufficient reason why they were not included in the first collection. The abrupt closing of the Book of Acts—for it was evidently written at about that time—that it might be ready for inclusion in this collection, goes to confirm the tradition as to the date of this collection. The Apocalypse and the four short Epistles which were not in readiness to be included at that early date, were afterward received into the Syriac Canon, but not till the sixth century."

The most noteworthy advocate of the "Peshitta-original" hypothesis in the West was George Lamsa of the Aramaic Bible Center. A tiny minority of more recent scholars are backers of the Peshitta-original theory today, whereas the overwhelming majority of scholars consider the Peshitta New Testament to be a translation from a Greek original. For instance Sebastian Brock wrote:

(Lamsa and Bauscher did not translate the Old Testament Peshitta's deuterocanonical books, but did translate the remainder of the Peshitta Old Testament, plus the New Testament. Gorgias Press has published translations of many Peshitta Old Testament books, and of the entire Peshitta New Testament.)

E. Jan Wilson writes, "I believe firmly that both Matthew and Luke were derived from Aramaic originals."

Some advocates of the "Peshitta-original" theory also use the term "Aramaic primacy", though this is not used in academic sources. The expression "Aramaic primacy" was used by L. I. Levine, but only as a general expression used to denote the primacy of Aramaic over Hebrew and Greek in Jerusalem during the Second Temple period (i.e. roughly 200 BC – 70 AD). The earliest appearance of the phrase in print is in David Bauscher.

Charles Cutler Torrey, while teaching at Yale, wrote a series of books that presented detailed manuscripturial evidence supporting the Aramaic New Testament, starting with The Translations Made from the Original Aramaic Gospels, and including the widely known Our Translated Gospels.

Brief history
George Lamsa's translation of the Peshitta New Testament from Syriac into English brought the claims for primacy of the Aramaic New Testament to the West. However, his translation is poorly regarded by most scholars in the field. The Old Syriac Texts, the Sinai palimpsest and the Curetonian Gospels, have also influenced scholars concerning original Aramaic passages. Diatessaronic texts such as the Liege Dutch Harmony, the Pepysian Gospel Harmony, Codex Fuldensis, the Persian Harmony, the Arabic Diatessaron, and the Commentary on the Diatessaron by Ephrem the Syrian have provided recent insights into Aramaic origins. The Coptic Gospel of Thomas and the various versions of the medieval Hebrew Gospel of Matthew also have provided clues to Aramaic foundations in the New Testament especially the gospels. Many 19th Century scholars (H. Holtzmann, Wendt, Jülicher, Wernle, Soden, Wellhausen, Harnack, B. Weiss, Nicolardot, W. Allen, Montefiore, Plummer, and Stanton) theorized that portions of the gospels, especially Matthew, were derived from an Aramaic source normally referred to as Q.

Argument using the Arabic Diatessaron for the old age of the Peshitta 

Tatian died in A.D. 175.  Reasoning and textual evidence suggest that Tatian started with the 4 Gospels in the Aramaic Peshitta, and interwove Gospel passages into one consolidated harmonized narrative to get his Diatesseron, in the process quoting three-fourths of the 4 Gospels.  We presently lack Tatian's Diatessaron in its original Aramaic, but do have it in translation in Arabic, a language related to Aramaic. A large number of parallels exist between the Peshitta's 4 Gospels and what is in the 'Arabic Diatessaron.' Paul Younan says,
"It makes perfect sense that a harmony of the Gospels would necessarily require that the distinct 4 Gospels actually existed prior to the harmony.  This is common sense.  It makes ever more sense that an Aramaic harmony of the Gospels, which Tatian's Diatesseron was, was woven together from the 4 distinct Aramaic Gospels.  ....  Since the Arabic translation by Ibn al-Tayyib is the only one we know for sure was made directly from the Aramaic, and since it reads like the Peshitta..., and since we know that a harmony necessitates a base of 4 distinct Gospels from which it must be drawn – I submit that Tatian's Aramaic Diatesseron was a harmony of the distinct Gospels in Aramaic we currently find today in the canon of scripture we know as the Peshitta.
Occam's Razor is a logical principle which states that one should not increase, beyond what is necessary, the number of entities required to explain anything.  In other words, the simplest explanation is usually the best. The simplest explanation is that Tatian created a harmony of the Peshitta gospels.  This harmony existed in Persia until at least the 11th century, when it was translated into Arabic.  ....if we are to believe the textual evidence in the Arabic translation... the Peshitta Gospels were the base of the Diatesseron which history attributes to Tatian.  And this places the Peshitta Gospels at or before 175 A.D."

The Arabic Diatessaron has been translated into English, Latin, French, and German.

Argument from geographical details for the old age of the Peshitta 

Advocates of the Aramaic being written first, and then translated into Greek, have pointed out the geographical details present in the Peshitta, but lacking in Greek mss.; those advocates ask what's the best explanation for the presence of those geographical details in the Peshitta, but lacking in Greek mss.

Johann David Michaelis states:

William Norton states:

Argument from bad Greek grammar in Revelation to it not being originally Greek
Torrey opines that Revelation was originally in Aramaic, and points to grammatical monstrosities as evidence that it was not originally written in Greek:

Historical criticism
An argument that at least one of the Greek books of the New Testament have been translated out of the Aramaic comes from a textual analysis of those attributed to the Apostle John. Their variation in writing style is so considerable, that it would preclude them having been written in Greek by the same author. St Dionysius of Alexandria lent support to this argument, when pointing out how John's style of writing differs so markedly between his Gospel and Revelation. He concluded that the sophisticated writer of the former could not have written the clumsy Greek of the latter. Thus, the only way for John to have been the author of Revelation is for it to have been penned by a translator. However, Dionysius himself left open the possibility that it was written in Greek "by a holy and inspired writer" other than John.

Some have argued that the Aramaic gospels are older than the Greek gospels, and that the Aramaic NT wasn't derived from the Greek NT. William Norton commented in 1889:

Norton later adds (on p. xlvii):

Norton mentions (on lix–lx) additional scholars who had high regard for the Aramaic, and gives a fuller exposition of Michaelis:

Mistranslations
Writing in 1936, Charles Cutler Torrey explains that the mistranslation at Jn 14:2 arose from an erroneous vocalization.

See also 

 List of English Bible translations#Modern Aramaic to English translations

References

Bibliography

External links
 Dukhrana.com — site contains the transcription of the Khaboris Codex plus Etheridge, Murdock, Lamsa, Younan's interlinear translation of Matthew – Acts 16, translations into Dutch and Afrikaans, and an interlinear study tool.
 Lamsa – OT and Lamsa – NT — Lamsa's translation of the Peshitta's Old Testament and New Testament
 aramaicdb.lightofword.org — site contains Magiera and Murdock, and an interlinear study tool
 Was the New Testament Really Written in Greek? — a book arguing for Aramaic primacy
 The Composition and Date of Acts (1916) by Charles Cutler Torrey
 Our Translated Gospels: Some of the Evidence (1936) by Charles Cutler Torrey
 The Origin of the Gospel According to St. John (1923) by James A. Montgomery

Aramaic languages
Biblical criticism
Bible translations into Aramaic
Bible-related controversies